U.S. Bankcard Services, Inc. (USBSI) is a provider of merchant services for credit card and other electronic payment transactions. The company is located in City of Industry, California, United States, and serves the United States. US Bankcard Services is an Elavon, Inc. company.

History 
USBSI was founded in 1996 by the current president, Chris Chang. East Asian and Southeast Asian merchants account for a majority of their customer base. In 2018 USBSI was purchased by U.S. Bancorp subsidiary, Elavon.

Services 
USBSI provides payment processing services for several electronic payment methods such as:
 the major American credit cards: Visa, MasterCard, American Express and Discover
 EBT cards,  check cards and debit cards
 Gift Cards
 Check Services
 UnionPay cards, operating under the approval of the People's Bank of China and used by Chinese tourists
 JCB
 Alipay Payment Service
Most of USBSI's merchants are restaurants and other food industry. However, its other merchants include mail order / telephone order, retail, ecommerce, supermarket and hotel businesses.

Multilingual payment terminal 

In 2006 USBSI and Hypercom Corp. (recently acquired by VeriFone) entered into an exclusive software agreement to offer the first multilanguage card payment terminal featuring Chinese and English graphics and text.

References 

Financial services companies of the United States
Merchant services
Point of sale companies
Retail point of sale systems
Privately held companies based in California